Goweriana is a monotypic genus of pinhead or dot snails that is endemic to Australia's Lord Howe Island in the Tasman Sea.

Species
 Goweriana berniceae Shea & Griffiths, 2010 – Bernice's pinhead snail

Description
The shells of this very rare species are fragile and broken easily, making it difficult ti find entire adult shells to measure. The globose shell of a subadult had a diameter of 3.5 mm, with a flat spire, and was transparent golden-brown in colour. The sutures are impressed and the whorls rounded, with moderately spaced, bladed radial ribs. The aperture is roundly lunate with a closed umbilicus. The animal is unknown.

Distribution and habitat
The main area of occurrence of the snail is on the upper slopes of Mount Gower, living in rain forest plant litter.

References

 
 

 
Punctidae
Monotypic gastropod genera
Gastropods described in 2010
Gastropods of Lord Howe Island